Leonard Thompson (9 September 1902 – 1 February 1976) was a British businessman who was the managing director and owner of Blackpool Pleasure Beach. He rose to his position in 1929 after the death of his wife's father, William Bean.

Biography
Leonard Thompson met his future wife, Doris Bean, in 1928. He worked for the Swedish Match Company at that time, and the couple soon decided to settle down in London. However, within 12 months Doris' father, William Bean, died whilst on a Mediterranean cruise. Both Leonard and his wife decided to return to Blackpool to try to keep the Pleasure Beach running, and maintain Bean's dream. While Doris became a director, Leonard became chairman and managing director of the park – roles than continued for almost 50 years.

Leonard's years of the running the Pleasure Beach saw many famous attractions opened, including the Grand National, Fun House and Ice Drome. There were also many lesser known rides introduced, many of which have been removed.

Personal lives
Leonard Thompson married Doris Bean in 1928. He had three children, Geoffrey, Mary Louise and Carol Jean. In 1948, tragedy struck the Thompson family when Leonard and Doris' elder daughter, Mary Louise, was on her way to study in America before taking up a place at Oxford University. As her plane came into land at Shannon Airport in dense fog, it hit a wall and burst into flames. Thirty passengers were killed, including Mary Louise.

Death
Leonard Thompson died on 1 February 1976. Leonard Thompson's son, Geoffrey, took control of the company with Doris taking on the role of company chairman.

References

1902 births
Blackpool Pleasure Beach
1976 deaths
20th-century English businesspeople